U Minh Thượng ("Upper U Minh") is a rural district of Kiên Giang province in Mekong Delta region of Vietnam. It was established in 2007. U Minh Thượng's area is 432.703 km² and its population is 68,076 people. The district is divided into six communes including Thạnh Yên, Thạnh Yên A, An Minh Bắc, Minh Thuận, Vĩnh Hòa and Hòa Chánh.

U Minh Thượng is bordered with Vĩnh Thuận in the east; An Biên and An Minh in the west; Cà Mau province in the south; and Gò Quao in the north.

Districts of Kiên Giang province